Mr. Nanny is a 1993 American family comedy film starring professional wrestler Hulk Hogan. The working title of the film was Rough Stuff, and David Johansen also recorded a song by that name for the film.

Plot
Sean Armstrong is a former wrestler living in Palm Beach, Florida and suffering from wrestler-days' nightmares. Burt Wilson, Sean's friend and former manager, has a bum leg from saving Sean's life and financial difficulties with his personal security business. With much whining and acting, Burt manages to persuade Sean to take a bodyguard job for Alex Mason Sr., the head of the prestigious tech firm, Mason Systems, which is developing a new anti-missile system, the Peacefinder Project. The vital information for this project is stored on a microchip. But it is neither the inventor nor the chip Sean has to guard - he is to look after the two Mason kids: Alex Jr. and Kate.

Alex and Kate are two highly mischievous kids who vie for their often-too-absent father's attention by wreaking havoc in the household via elaborate and rather vicious pranks and booby-traps, with their specialty targets being the nannies he has assigned to take care of them (Alex Sr. is a widower). However, their father proves to be either too distracted or too lenient, which causes the children to continue their schemes. Thinking that he is a new (albeit unusual) replacement, they find a new target in Sean. But after one prank too many, which involves a swimming pool full of red dye ("the Pit of Blood"), Sean finally exerts his authority and not only gets to quiet Alex and Kate down, he also manages to open the eyes of their father to his family problems, as well as bonding with the kids and managing to help them sort out problems of their own.

Mason's chip is coveted by Tommy Thanatos, an unscrupulous and vain criminal who will not stop at anything to get it. As it turns out, Sean and Burt had been once at the receiving end of one of his schemes: he had ordered them to throw a match, and when they had not complied, he attempted to shoot them. However, Burt threw himself in front of Sean, taking the bullet in his right leg; Sean had chased Thanatos to the roof of the stadium, and after a furious fight, Thanatos ended up plunging head-first into an empty pool. This accident fractured the top of his skull, forcing the attachment of a steel skullplate and removing part of his proud afro mane.

Thanatos kidnaps Alex Sr. with the help of Frank Olsen, the corrupt security chief of Mason Systems (who is disposed of en route to the hideout), and demands of him to hand over the chip. When Alex Sr. (who stowed the chip in Kate's doll) refuses, Thanatos has Alex and Kate kidnapped in order to force him to comply. Despite a valiant effort, Sean is overpowered and Burt is taken as well, giving Thanatos an unexpected revenge bonus. But Sean manages to track down Thanatos, and with the help of his friends is able to beat the villains. As Thanatos prepares to charge Sean, Alex Sr. and the children activate an improvised electromagnet to launch him into the night sky, leaving only his skullplate.

The movie ends with Sean preparing to take a leave of absence from the Masons. But Alex and Kate intend to have him back much sooner - and therefore Sean falls victim to yet another prank.

Cast

 Hulk Hogan as Sean Armstrong
 Sherman Hemsley as Burt Wilson
 Austin Pendleton as Alex Mason Sr.
 Madeline Zima as Kate Mason
 Robert Gorman as Alex Mason Jr. 
 Mother Love as Corinne
 David Johansen as Tommy Thanatos
 Raymond O'Connor as Frank Olsen
 Peter Kent as Wolfgang
 Jen Sung as Kojiro
 Jeff Moldovan as Jocko
 Artie Malesci as Skipper
 Tim Powell as Lieutenant
 Sandy Mielke as Principal
 Darci Osiecky as Teacher
 Kelly Erin as Nanny
 Joshua Santiago as Bully #1
 Danny Fotou as Bully #2
 Afa Anoaʻi as himself
 Brutus Beefcake as himself
 George "The Animal" Steele as himself
 Jim “The Anvil” Neidhart as himself (uncredited)
 Kamala as himself (uncredited)
 Angeline-Rose Troy as Student (uncredited)

Reception

Box office
The film was a box office bomb, grossing just $4.3 million against its $10 million budget.

Critical response
The film was poorly received by critics. On Rotten Tomatoes it has an approval rating of 6% based on reviews from 16 critics.

Kevin Thomas of the Los Angeles Times says the premise has potential but that the film is "needlessly crass and lethally heavy-handed" Chris Hicks of the Deseret News calls the film "a silly kiddie flick that retreads territory better covered by Mr. Mom, Home Alone and any number of clones." He calls the film predictable and finds the comic mayhem difficult to recommend for children.

References

External links
 
 
 

1990s American films
1990s English-language films
1993 films
Fiction about child care occupations
Films set in Miami
Films directed by Michael Gottlieb
New Line Cinema films
American comedy films
Films about bodyguards
Wrestling films